This is a list of premiers of Newfoundland and Labrador, since the jurisdiction joined Canadian confederation in 1949, in order of time served in office as of . The preceding premier always stays in office during an election campaign, and that time is included in the total.

References

Newfoundland and Labrador